WNKO (101.7 FM) is an American radio station located in New Albany, Ohio. WNKO plays classic hits and calls itself "KOOL 101.7".

The station is locally owned and operated by the Runnymede Corporation. WNKO began operating in 1972 and is the sister station to WHTH.

The station had previously covered only the Newark, Ohio vicinity with 3,000 watts of power. In 2009, WNKO filed an application to change its city of license to New Albany, Ohio, change its transmitter location, and upgrade power. The move was tentative on WKSW (now WCLI-FM), formerly in Urbana, Ohio, completing a move into the Dayton market and switching frequencies from 101.7 to 101.5. Until such completion was made, WNKO could not otherwise move because its signal was limited with WKSW.

On March 25, 2011 WNKO began broadcasting from its new transmitter in Johnstown, Ohio. With this change, the station began providing a serviceable signal to the Columbus metropolitan area.

The station's management stated that WNKO would continue to concentrate exclusively on serving the Newark area. Moreover, the station identifies itself hourly as "WNKO New Albany-Newark". However, it is speculated that the move was done to prepare to sell the station in the more lucrative Columbus market.

WNKO broadcasts in the HD format. WNKO is licensed to broadcast a digital hybrid (HD) signal.

External links
WNKO official website

References

NKO
Classic hits radio stations in the United States
WNKO
Radio stations established in 1972